Sophie Wahnich is a French historian. She is director of research at the French National Centre for Scientific Research (CNRS) and a specialist in the French Revolution.

Biography
Sophie Wahnich holds an agrégation (1988) and a doctorate in history (1994), and is qualified to direct research (2007). 

Wahnich is director of research at the CNRS and director of the Institut Interdisciplinaire d'Anthropologie du Contemporain (IIAC). Her work focuses on the relationship between the French Revolution and the present time. Her thesis was on the notion of the foreigner in the discourse of the French Revolution, and her Habilitation was entitled . 

She is involved in various collectives.

She also denounces a "privatization of knowledge ", which led her to be the candidate of the Pirate Party in the 12th district of the Hauts-de-Seine during the 2012 legislative elections. 

She co-signed tribunes in various media, including one published in 2017 in Mediapart entitled "Faire gagner la gauche passe par le vote Mélenchon" (Making the left win goes through the Mélenchon vote).

Selected works
L’Impossible Citoyen, l'étranger dans le discours de la Révolution française, Éditions Albin Michel (1997).Reissued in 2010 in the collection , with an afterword by the author.
 Lyon en Révolution, des objets qui racontent l’histoire, Lyon, EMCC, June 2003.   
 La Liberté ou la mort — Essai sur la Terreur et le terrorisme, Éditions La Fabrique (2003). Reprinted in English, In Defence of Terror, Liberty or Death in the French Révolution, London, New York, Verso, 2012. 
 La Longue Patience du peuple, 1792, naissance de la République, Paris, Payot, 2008.
 Les Émotions, la Révolution française et le présent : Exercices pratiques de conscience historique, Paris, CNRS Éditions, 2009.
 La Révolution française, un événement de la raison sensible, Paris, Hachette, 2012.
 L’intelligence politique de la Révolution française, Paris, Textuel, 2013.
 La Révolution française n'est pas un mythe, Paris, Klincksieck, collection "Critique de la politique", 2017.
 Le Radeau démocratique. Chroniques des temps incertains, Paris, Éditions Lignes, 2017.
 Le Ruban tricolore. Un lien politique, Paris, Groupe Bayard, 2022.

References

Living people
21st-century French historians
Year of birth missing (living people)
Research directors of the French National Centre for Scientific Research